Maur Assembly constituency is one of the 117 Legislative Assembly constituencies of Punjab state in India representing Maur.
It is part of Bathinda district. The constituency was created and went for election for the first time in 2012.

Members of the Legislative Assembly 
 2007: Jagdeep Singh Nakkai

Election results

2022

2017

2012

See also
 List of constituencies of the Punjab Legislative Assembly
 Bathinda district

References

External links
  

Assembly constituencies of Punjab, India
Bathinda district